Graham Creek is a stream in Alberta, Canada. It is a tributary of the Landels River. Its source is Graham Lake in Saskatchewan, just to the east of the Alberta border. From the lake, Graham Creek flows east into Alberta then north-east to Landels River, which flows into the Winefred River which flows into the Christina River.

Graham Creek has the name of Graham Davies, a government surveyor.

See also
List of rivers of Alberta
List of rivers of Saskatchewan

References

External links

Rivers of Alberta
Rivers of Saskatchewan